The Northern Football Federation (NFF) was an association football organisation, responsible for local growth and developing the game in West Auckland, North Shore and Northland, New Zealand.

In 2020 it was merged with Auckland Football Federation into the Northern Region Football.

Staff
Staff Directory

Board

Life Members

Representative teams

 National Women's League Squad 2015
 NFF National Futsal League Squad 2015

Football Honors

Futsal Honors

Member clubs

References

External links
Official website

Association football in Auckland